Geli (، also Romanized as Gelī) is a village in Sharwineh Rural District, Kalashi District, Javanrud County, Kermanshah Province, Iran. At the 2006 census, its population was 44, in 8 families.

References 

Populated places in Javanrud County